Alexander Ralston (1771 – January 5, 1827) was a Scottish surveyor who was one of two co-architects for the design of the city of Indianapolis, Indiana. He also helped to design Washington, D.C.

Life
Alexander Ralston was born in Scotland in 1771. In Britain he was an engineer working for the Baron of Roslin on his estate before immigrating to the United States after the American Revolution. An assistant to the French-American architect Pierre (Peter) Charles L'Enfant in 1791, Ralston helped L'Enfant lay out the city plan for Washington, D.C. (see L'Enfant Plan). Ralston came to Indiana sometime before 1815, leaving the east partly because of his involvement with Aaron Burr and the Burr conspiracy. He settled on a homestead in southern Indiana.

He was first hired in 1820 by Christopher Harrison, the state commissioner overseeing the survey of Indianapolis, and charged with helping to survey the city. With co-surveyor Elias Pym Fordham, Ralston's was later commissioned by the Indiana General Assembly to make a city plan for Indianapolis, developed in 1821. His original plan called for a city of only , with a Governor's Circle, a large circular commons, the original site of the Governor's mansion, at the very center of the city. The Governor's mansion was demolished in 1857. In its place stands a 284-foot-tall (86.5-meter-tall) neoclassical limestone and bronze monument, the Soldiers' and Sailors' Monument. Ralston's design borrows heavily from the city plan of Washington D.C.

Construction on Indianapolis began in earnest, with most of his plan being implemented by 1850. The city has subsequently expanded far beyond his original conception, but the downtown area remained nearly unaltered from Ralston's original city plan. Ralston died in his Indianapolis home on January 5, 1827, and was buried at Greenlawn Cemetery. In 1874, his remains were moved and reburied in Crown Hill Cemetery in Indianapolis. His gravestone is engraved with an image of his plat of the city's initial design.

Notes

External links

 

Architects from Indianapolis
1771 births
1827 deaths
Burials at Crown Hill Cemetery
Scottish architects
American architects
American surveyors
Scottish surveyors